The Embi mole-rat (Tachyoryctes spalacinus) is a species of rodent in the family Spalacidae endemic to Kenya.  Its natural habitats are subtropical or tropical moist montane forests, moist savanna, arable land, pastureland, plantations, and heavily degraded former forest.

Some taxonomic authorities consider it to be conspecific with the East African mole-rat.

References

Mammals of Kenya
Tachyoryctes
Endemic fauna of Kenya
Animals described in 1909
Taxa named by Oldfield Thomas
Taxonomy articles created by Polbot
Taxobox binomials not recognized by IUCN